"Stuck with Each Other" is the second solo single released by Barbadian singer Shontelle. It features R&B singer Akon and is the first single from the re-release of her debut album, Shontelligence. It is also featured on the Confessions of a Shopaholic soundtrack. The song was the second single from Shontelligence in the UK, being added to BBC Radio 1's C-list playlist on April 22, 2009, and has since reached the B-List. "Stuck with Each Other" also reached the A-List of BBC Radio 2's playlist. It became her second top 30 hit in the UK Singles Chart.

Reception
David Balls of Digital Spy gave the song 3/5 stars: 
After visiting the top ten with 'T-Shirt' earlier this year, it looked as though Shontelle really could follow in the footsteps of her countrywoman Rihanna. However, her debut album Shontelligence has thus far failed to crack the top 100 on either side of the Atlantic, so her record company have sprung into panic mode. Deciding the best option would be to draft in an urban heavyweight to raise her profile, Akon's services have been utilised and fingers are being kept firmly crossed. The result is 'Stuck With Each Other', a Diane Warren-penned midtempo R&B tune that could just as easily have been recorded by the Rowlands, Sparks and Hudsons of this world. But having stretched the definition of "generic" and "mind-numbing" on recent releases, Akon comes across surprisingly well here, with the pair delivering a strong and mutually complementary vocal performance. There are more inspiring tracks on Shontelle's album - 'Roll It' being a prime example - so let's hope it's one big porkie when she tells Akon: "There's nothing I'd rather do than stick with you forever."

Music video
The music video was directed by Gil Green and was released to Shontelle's official fansite on March 4, 2009.

It features both Shontelle and Akon. The video starts off with Shontelle and her boyfriend shopping with Shontelle trying on many outfits and coming out of fitting rooms whilst clips of the movie are shown. During Akon's verse it has them against a gold background which appears to be a picture on the wall. Other pictures on the walls are clips of the film, Confessions of a Shopaholic. Then Shontelle and her boyfriend end up putting clothes in a bag.

Track listing
UK digital single
 "Stuck with Each Other" (Main)
 "Stuck with Each Other" (Riff & Rays Remix - Club Edit)	
 "Stuck with Each Other" (Dubwise Tribal Life Mix)	
 "Stuck with Each Other" (Self Taught Beats Mix)

Charts

References

2008 songs
2009 singles
Akon songs
Motown singles
Music videos directed by Gil Green
Shontelle songs
Song recordings produced by Rodney Jerkins
Songs written by Diane Warren
Songs written by Kalenna Harper
Songs written by Rodney Jerkins